Buttermilk Falls State Park is a  state park located southwest of Ithaca, New York, United States. Like Robert H. Treman State Park, a portion of the land that was to become the state park came from Robert and Laura Treman in 1924.

History
Buttermilk Falls was named for the frothy appearance of its churning waters. The naming of the cascade was described in 1866:

The original  of the park were presented as a gift to New York State by Robert and Laura Treman in 1924. It grew to its current  size through various state acquisitions in the years that followed.

Revolutionary War era soldier Joseph Plumb Martin mentioned a Buttermilk Falls in his diary; however, this refers to present day Highland Falls in the Hudson Valley and not in Ithaca, NY.

Geology
The rock formations within the park are primarily made of Devonian shale and sandstone. These rocks formed in horizontal layers, creating flat slabs and angular edges as they erode and fracture. The gorge and waterfalls formed since the last ice age — within the last twenty or thirty thousands years — as Buttermilk Creek eroded back from the head of a hanging valley. Additional formations along the creek include potholes and a stack called "Pinnacle Rock".

Park description
Buttermilk Falls State Park features 10 waterfalls in total, with Buttermilk Falls being the main attraction. The park also offers a beach, cabins, fishing, hiking, deer bow-hunting, nature trails, pavilions, a playground, playing fields, recreation programs, and a campground with tent and trailer sites.

Trails
The nature trails in the park include Gorge Trail, which follows Buttermilk Creek as it cascades, dropping about  along the trail. Beyond these two trails is the Bear Trail which continues up Buttermilk Creek to Lake Treman Falls and Lake Treman. The trail to and around the lake is another . At the far end of the lake is a spur of the Finger Lakes Trail.

Gallery

See also
 List of New York state parks
 Trails in Ithaca, New York

References

External links

 New York State Parks: Buttermilk Falls State Park

State parks of New York (state)
Parks in Tompkins County, New York
Tourist attractions in Ithaca, New York
Waterfalls of New York (state)